Manic Hedgehog can refer to:

 a 1991 demo tape by English rock band Radiohead
 a character from Sonic Underground